Live at Birdland (stylized on the cover as Coltrane live at Birdland) is an album by jazz saxophonist John Coltrane featuring both live and in-studio components, originally released on January 9, 1964, on the Impulse! label. Similarly to Impressions, despite the album's title, only three of its tracks were actually recorded live at the Birdland club; the remainder are studio recordings. Among them is "Alabama", a tribute to four black children killed in the 16th Street Baptist Church bombing, a terrorist attack in Birmingham, Alabama perpetrated by white supremacists.

The album's original pressing accidentally included a false start–– this was corrected in later copies, but restored in CD editions. The album also features a live recording of "I Want to Talk About You", a song Coltrane had recorded on his 1958 album Soultrane, this time with an extended cadenza.

Reception
Scott Yanow's five-star AllMusic review calls the recording "[a]rguably John Coltrane's finest all-around album". A review in All About Jazz states: "Coltrane Live at Birdland showcases 'The Great Quartet' in excellent form: Elvin banging and cursin', McCoy a steady force maintaining the form, Jimmy Garrison pacing the beat and Coltrane stretching out into space filling the void... A definite collectors' item." Reviewer C. Michael Bailey wrote: "If the listener wishes to hear the master in transition, look no further than Coltrane Live at Birdland." LeRoi Jones wrote: "There is a daringly human quality to John Coltrane's music that makes itself felt, wherever he records. If you can hear, this music will make you think of a lot of weird and wonderful things. You might even become one of them."

Regarding the track "Alabama", Ben Ratliff wrote: "It is a striking piece of music. If anyone wants to begin to understand how Coltrane could inspire so much awe so quickly, the reason is probably inside 'Alabama.' The incantational tumult he could raise in a long improvisation, the steel-trap knowledge of harmony, the writing—that's all very impressive. But 'Alabama' is also an accurate psychological portrait of a time, a complicated mood that nobody else could render so well."

Track listing
All songs written by John Coltrane except as indicated
"Afro Blue" (Mongo Santamaria) – 10:50
"I Want to Talk About You" (Billy Eckstine) – 8:11
"The Promise" – 8:10
"Alabama" – 5:09
"Your Lady" – 6:39
Compact Disc bonus track
"Vilia" – 4:36

"Vilia" is the main melodic statement to the Franz Lehár piece "Vivias", set to a swing feel and chord changes. This track was first released on a 1965 compilation by Impulse!

Personnel

John Coltrane – tenor saxophone, soprano saxophone
McCoy Tyner – piano
Jimmy Garrison – double bass
Elvin Jones – drums

References 

John Coltrane live albums
1964 live albums
Live avant-garde jazz albums
Live post-bop albums
Impulse! Records live albums
Albums recorded at Van Gelder Studio
Albums recorded at Birdland